Hanam Pungsan Station is a subway station on the Hanam Line of Seoul Subway Line 5 in Hanam-si, Gyeonggi-do.

Station layout

References 

Railway stations opened in 2020
Seoul Metropolitan Subway stations
Metro stations in Hanam
Seoul Subway Line 5
2020 establishments in South Korea